Bournemouth Town Centre is an area of Bournemouth, Dorset. The town centre is the central business district and is located near the coast between West Cliff and East Cliff.

History 
In 1908 a tramway accident killed 7 people in the Town Centre.

The COVID-19 pandemic in the United Kingdom has affected business in the town centre. The New Look store in the town centre will close in February 2022 after 21 years. The Wilko will close the same month. A shift from retail towards entertainment and eating out is predicted to be the future of the town centre. On 13 March 2022, the towns House of Fraser, closed for the final time. The store, which first opened in 1873, was Bournemouth's last remaining department store after the flagship Beales closed in 2020, and Debenhams closed in 2021. Despite this Bournemouth, Christchurch and Poole Council are reportedly optimistic about the future of the town centre.

Areas 
The town centre is where The Square is.

Areas include Richmond Hill and Lansdowne.

Gardens

Buildings 

 Royal Exeter Hotel (1812)
 Royal Bath Hotel (1838)
 Norfolk Royale Hotel (1850)
 Sacred Heart Church (1874)
 St Michael's Church, Bournemouth (1875)
 St Swithun's Church (1877)
 St Peter's Church (1879)
 Bournemouth Town Hall (1885)
 St. Andrew's Church (1891)
 Bournemouth and Poole College (1913)
 Pavilion Theatre (1929)
 Bournemouth International Centre (1984)

Politics 
Bournemouth Town Centre is part of the Bournemouth Central ward for elections to the Bournemouth, Christchurch and Poole Council. The same ward elected councillors to the former Bournemouth Borough Council.

The town centre is also part of the Bournemouth West parliamentary constituency for elections to the House of Commons of the United Kingdom.  The current MP, since 2010, is the Conservative Conor Burns.

See also 

 Castlepoint Shopping Centre, in North Bournemouth

References 

Areas of Bournemouth
Shopping centres in Dorset
Central business districts in the United Kingdom